MV Isle of Mull is one of the larger Caledonian Maritime Assets Limited ferries operated by Caledonian MacBrayne from Oban on the west of Scotland.

History
MV Isle of Mull was designed for the route between Oban and Craignure on the Isle of Mull. After being launched on the Clyde in 1987, she entered service on 11 April 1988, in place of the older and slower . 

However the new vessel was seriously overweight – by more than 100 tons – due to both design and steel supply, British Steel had installed a new computerised gauge control at its Dalzell Plate production unit, and during the initial production of steel plate after its introduction it tended to produce plates still within the allowed manufacturing specification, but at or near the upper gauge allowed in the tolerance – resulting in the steel tending to be heavier than designed.

The extent of this implant can most easily be observed when climbing the stairs from the car deck to the passenger accommodation. These stairs used to be a single flight, but now have a level section halfway up. The new length of hull made the vessel better both in terms of vehicle capacity (taking it to around 80) but also in that she handled better at sea with her overall speed increased slightly. 

In the late 1990s she underwent internal refurbishment. Her cafeteria was redecorated and the serving area modified – setting the standard for the rest of the fleet. The shop was moved to a more prominent position in the entrance concourse and she received new seating covers etc. The Isle of Mull underwent another major refurbishment in 2005. The cafeteria was redesigned with a new service area layout, including self-service tea and coffee machines and was renamed the Mariners Cafeteria. A coffee bar was installed in the viewing lounge at the after end of the ship opposite the doors leading out to the open deck which overlooks the rope handling area of the ship and is named the Coffee Cabin. The bar has also been renamed The Still.

Layout
The totally enclosed car deck has room for up to 70 cars. She is equipped with a bow visor, bow ramp and stern ramp. The two-part folding bow ramp is shaped like an inverted "L". When raised, the main section plugs the access to the car deck. The forward section folds out flat upon contact with the linkspan.

Above the car deck are two levels of accommodation, providing shelter and facilities for up to 1000 passengers. The first deck houses the cafeteria at the bow, with the main entrance concourse and shop immediately aft. Behind this are lounges, toilets and the information desk, with the bar at the stern. The next deck has an observation lounge at the stern and crew accommodation further forward. External deck space stretches from the lounge to just short of the bridge on both sides. An observation lounge on the top deck has seating aft of the funnel. The large amount of open deck space is one factor that makes the Isle of Mull popular with tourists.

Service
MV Isle of Mull has operated the crossing between Oban and Craignure on the Isle of Mull since 1988. She completes the sailing in 45 minutes on a good day, although the short turnaround and poor manoeuvrability in even light winds lead to frequent delays and increased cancellations. Isle of Mull also provides one of 4 weekly ferries between the mainland and the island of Colonsay in winter, this being the Monday sailing. 

In October 1989, her larger passenger capacity was required at Stornoway for those travelling to the Mòd. This meant she basically swapped places with the Suilven, which covered the Oban to Craignure service for 10 days. During the winter of 2021/22, Isle of Mull was the scheduled winter relief vessel between Oban & Castlebay and Oban & Lochboisdale, a role which continued into the following winter and looks set to continue for some years to come. In regard to Lochboisdale, Isle of Mull cannot berth from Mallaig due to her length, instead sailing from her familiar port of Oban.

In addition to these roles, Isle of Mull has also made occasional sailings to Coll & Tiree over the years whenever the need has arisen. Her higher passenger capacity compared to  &  proves a massive help during the annual Tiree Music Festival every July, and when she needs to tend to the needs of both Coll & Tiree at busy times such as this, another vessel, usually Clansman, will look after the Craignure service. Isle of Mull has also been sighted providing emergency services to Islay over in recent years, usually sailing to and from Port Askaig, despite the fact that she has also visited Kennacraig and Port Ellen, whilst also calling at Colonsay in each direction if required.

 In August 2022, Isle of Mull made her first full appearance on the triangle connecting Uig, Lochmaddy and Tarbert, relieving , which was withdrawn from service for repairs to her firefighting equipment.

See also
Caledonian MacBrayne fleet

References

Caledonian MacBrayne
1987 ships
Oban
Ships built on the River Clyde